Ahmad Nazlan bin Idris (Jawi:  أحمد نظلان بن إدريس) is a Malaysian politician who has served as Chairman of the Perbadanan Usahawan Nasional Berhad (PUNB) since October 2021, of the Malaysian Rubber Board (MRB) from April 2020 to April 2021 and of the Kolej Poly Tech Mara (KPTM) from 2015 to June 2018. He served as the Member of Parliament (MP) for Jerantut from May 2013 to November 2022. He is a member of the United Malays National Organisation (UMNO), a component party of the ruling Barisan Nasional (BN) coalition.He is also the Division Chief of UMNO of Jerantut.

Election results

Honours
 :
 Knight Companion of the Order of the Crown of Pahang (DIMP) – Dato’ (2015)

References

Living people
People from Pahang
Malaysian people of Malay descent
Malaysian Muslims
United Malays National Organisation politicians
Members of the Dewan Rakyat
21st-century Malaysian politicians
Year of birth missing (living people)